Discoteuthis laciniosa is a species of squid in the family Cycloteuthidae. The species occurs throughout the Atlantic, Indian and Pacific Oceans.

References

External links 
 Tree of Life web project: Discoteuthis laciniosa

Molluscs described in 1969
Molluscs of the Indian Ocean
Molluscs of the Atlantic Ocean
Molluscs of the Pacific Ocean
Squid